Eric Lee Troyer (born 10 April 1949) is an American keyboardist, singer, songwriter, and occasional guitarist, best known as a member of ELO Part II and its successor The Orchestra.  Troyer was a founding member of ELO Part II, having been recruited by band leader Bev Bevan in 1988. He wrote a substantial quantity of the material on ELO Part II's three albums: Electric Light Orchestra Part Two; Moment of Truth; and One Night, a live album recorded in Australia. He also wrote a large amount of The Orchestra's album No Rewind.

Life and career
Troyer has performed on various albums as a session musician and backing vocalist, including albums by John Lennon, Bonnie Tyler, and Celine Dion.

Troyer performed on  the movie soundtracks for Footloose, Chicago, Flashdance, and Streets of Fire.

In 1988 Troyer co-founded the Electric Light Orchestra Part II with The Move/E.L.O. drummer Bev Bevan. Troyer contributed to all of ELO Part II's studio and live albums, including the songs "Honest Men", "Thousand Eyes", and "For the Love of a Woman". In 2000, ELO Part II was renamed to The Orchestra. Troyer has also written and performed music for various ad campaigns, including Kool-Aid and IBM.

In 1980, Troyer had a minor solo hit with "Mirage", peaking at No. 92 in the Hot 100 chart. However it fared better on the AC, peaking at No. 43. An accompanying album titled String of Pearls was recorded, but never officially released. Thirteen years later, he did release a solo CD, Model Citizen. The song was Troyer's only charting single in Australia, peaking at number 97.

Troyer is married to writer/filmmaker Kee Kee Buckley, with whom he owns the production company Ad Hoc Media Partners. He has three daughters from a previous marriage: Asia, Lindsay, and Lauren.

Discography

References

External links

Eric Troyer
About Ad Hoc Media Partners
Eric Troyer, String of Pearls - 31m 37s - Music CDs and CD Cover Arts @ Online Music CD Database
Eric Troyer

[ Collaborations @ Allmusic.com – credits]
Theorchestra.sitesled.com
Members.iinet.net.au
Under 30 May 1999: Mentions the potential title of Troyer's unreleased 1980 album

1949 births
American rock keyboardists
American rock songwriters
American rock singers
Living people
Neverland Express members
People from Elkhart, Indiana
Singer-songwriters from Indiana